Ratu Jovesa Dauruatana Sovasova (1942 - 8 April 2005) was a Fijian chief, who held the title of Tui Vitogo, or Paramount Chief of Vitogo village, from 30 June 1970 till his death.

In his funeral eulogy, Lautoka police chief Rusiate Saini praised Sovasova for his commitment to the rule of law and for his efforts to foster cooperative relationships among all the villages in Lautoka.  He was also known to be passionate about economic development and was involved in a number of projects such as the Vitogo housing project, Vitogo police post and the village's electrification scheme.

Sovasova was survived by his wife, Adi Paulina Nai, four children, and five grandchildren.

Native Lands Commission (NLC) Chairman Ratu Viliame Tagiveitua announced on 10 March 2006 that Sovasova's relative, Ratu Viliame Sovasova, had been chosen to succeed him. Ratu Viliame Sovasova is married to Adi Litiana Ro Vataleba Marakiwai of Natewa, from the Mataqali Valenisau - one of the two clans from which the Vunivalu of Natewa is chosen.

People from Ba Province
Fijian chiefs
1942 births
2005 deaths